A bridge is a structure built so that a transportation route can cross above an obstacle.

Bridge can also refer to:

Places
 Bridge (ward), a ward in London
 Bridge, Kent, in Kent, England
 Bridge, Oregon, in Oregon, US
 Bridge Ward, Ipswich, Suffolk, England
 Bridge of Allan, a number of places in Scotland
 Bridge River, a river in British Columbia, Canada
 Bridge River Cones, a group of volcanoes in British Columbia, Canada

People
 Bridge (surname)
 Bridge (musician) - an American singer, songwriter and producer

Arts, entertainment, and media

Card games
Bridge whist or straight bridge, derived from whist
Auction bridge, a further derivation popular in the early 20th century
Contract bridge, the modern form of the game 
Two main variants:
Duplicate bridge, in which the same set of deals are played by all competitors
Rubber bridge, the basic game, where two partnerships play until one has won two games, called a rubber
Additional variants:
Chicago (bridge card game), which is played similarly to rubber bridge but a session is limited to four deals 
Singaporean bridge, a re-invention of the game with very different rules

Films
Bridge (1949 film), a Chinese film
Die Brücke (film) (The Bridge), a 1959 German film
The Bridge (1969 film), a Yugoslav film
Bridge (1988 film), a USA–USSR film
The Bridge (Scandinavian TV series) (2011– ), Danish/Swedish production crime drama
The Bridge on the River Kwai, a 1957 British-American adventure war film

Literature
The Bridge (long poem), a 1930 long poem by Hart Crane
The Bridge (short story), a 1931 short story by Franz Kafka
The Bridge (novel), a 1986 science fiction novel by Iain Banks
The Bridge, a 1986 fantasy novel by Jeri Massi
The Bridge, a 1973 horror novel by John Skipp and Craig Spector
The Bridge, a 2001 novel by Doug Marlette
The Bridge, a 2003 mystery novel by Solomon Jones
The Bridge, a 2012 romance novel by Karen Kingsbury
Bridge, a 2014 novel by Patrick Jones

Music
Bridge (Blues Traveler album)
Bridge (Joey Cape album), 2008
Bridge (Speed album)
Bridge, a Japanese-language album by Hound Dog
Red House Painters (Bridge), the third album by Red House Painters, often referred to as the Bridge album

Songs
"Bridge" (song), a song by Queensrÿche
"Bridge Over Troubled Water", a hit song

Other music
Bridge (music), an interlude that connects two parts of a song
Bridge Records, Inc., a record label

Musical instruments
Bridge (instrument), the device that anchors the strings to or holds the strings above the body of a stringed instrument
3rd bridge, an additional bridge added to a stringed instrument

Other arts, entertainment, and media
Bridge Carson, a Power Rangers character
Bridge (studio), a Japanese animation studio
W281BE, a radio station licensed to Fort Mill, South Carolina, United States called 104.1 the Bridge

Electronics, engineering, and technology 
 Bridge, in clock- and watchmaking, a component in an ébauche
 Adobe Bridge, digital asset management software
 Bridge camera, generally considered to fill the niche between single-lens reflex (SLR) and compact point-and-shoot cameras
 Bridge circuit
 Bridge rectifier, an electronic circuit for converting alternating current to direct current
 H-bridge, an electronic circuit which enables DC electric motors to be run forwards or backwards
 Wheatstone bridge, an electronic circuit for comparing resistors, capacitors or inductors to high standards of accuracy
 Bridge pattern, a computer science design used to separate an abstraction and its actual implementation
 Bridging (networking), the action taken by IT network equipment to allow two or more communication networks to create an amalgamated network
 Northbridge (computing) and Southbridge (computing): two chips in the core logic chipset architecture on a PC motherboard
 Protocol bridge, an electronics device or piece of software that translates from one communications protocol or programming API to another

Fitness and sports
Bridge (exercise), most commonly, the balancing of the body on the head and feet
Bridge (grappling), in wrestling, a move intended to dislodge an opponent in top control
Mechanical bridge, a piece of cue sports equipment

Healthcare
Bridge (dentistry), a fixed prosthesis used to replace missing teeth
Myocardial bridge, a heart defect

Mathematics
Bridge (graph theory), an edge whose removal disconnects a graph
Brownian bridge, in probability theory, the conditional distribution of a process pinned both at the origin and at the end point

Science  
Bridge (chemical), an unbranched chain of atoms or an atom or a covalent bond connecting two bridgeheads in a polycyclic compound
A bridging ligand in inorganic chemicals
A disulfide bridge found in proteins
Salt bridge (protein) (or salt bond), in protein chemistry, is the term used to denote chemical bonds between positively and negatively charged side-chains of proteins
Salt bridge, in chemistry, a laboratory device used to connect the oxidation and reduction half-cells of a galvanic cell (electrochemical cell)
 British Mid-Ocean Ridge Initiative

Transportation
Bridge (nautical), the area of a ship from which it is commanded
Bridge class stores ship, a class of ship
Bridge-class OBO carrier, a class of ship
SS Empire Bridge or SS Bridge, an Empire ship
USS Bridge, several ships of the name

Other uses
Bridge (hill), a classification of British hills
Bridge (interpersonal), in social networks, a relationship that acts as a communication channel between different groups
Bridge loan, a short-term loan to cover a gap in time until a new long-term financing is realised
Bridge program (higher education), a higher education program
Natural bridge, a rock formation where an arch has formed with an opening underneath
Suicide bridge, a bridge used frequently to die by suicide

See also
 Bridge the gap (disambiguation)
 Bridge to Nowhere (disambiguation)
 Bridges (disambiguation)
 Stamford Bridge (disambiguation)
 The Bridge (disambiguation)